Sooy Place (pronounced so-ee) is an unincorporated community located within Tabernacle Township in Burlington County, New Jersey, United States. The settlement is located in a rural part of the township centered on the intersection of Sooy Place Road and Powell Place Road. The area is a mix of forestland, some properties with single-family residences, and two horse farms. Per a historical marker present at the intersection, the settlement was also home to Pine Tavern, a travelers' stop for those traveling to Speedwell Furnace near Chatsworth.

References

Populated places in the Pine Barrens (New Jersey)
Tabernacle Township, New Jersey
Unincorporated communities in Burlington County, New Jersey
Unincorporated communities in New Jersey